The 2000–01 Hofstra Pride men's basketball team represented Hofstra University from Hempstead, New York in the 2000–01 Season. Led by head coach Jay Wright, Hofstra finished with a record of 26–5, the best in the AEC, and won the AEC tournament. As a result of winning the tournament, Hofstra was invited to the NCAA tournament. Although Hofstra fell in the first round of the tournament, coach Wright departed in the off-season to become the new head coach of Villanova, whom he would coach to National Championships in 2016 and 2018.

Postseason results
AEC Tournament
3/3/01 @ Bob Carpenter Center, Newark, DE Vs. Vermont W, 68–55
3/4/01 @ Bob Carpenter Center, Newark, DE Vs. Maine W, 78–66
3/10/01 @ Hofstra Arena, Hempstead, NY Vs. Delaware W, 68–54
NCAA Tournament
3/15/01 @ Greensboro Coliseum, Greensboro, NC Vs. UCLA L, 48–61

References

Hofstra Pride men's basketball seasons
Hofstra
Hofstra
2000 in sports in New York (state)
2001 in sports in New York (state)